Midnight Caller is an American drama television series created by Richard DiLello, which aired on NBC from October 25, 1988, to May 17, 1991. It was one of the first television series to address the dramatic possibilities of the then-growing phenomenon of talk radio.

Premise
Jack Killian is a former San Francisco police detective who quits the force after he accidentally shot his partner dead in a confrontation with armed criminals. After lapsing into alcoholism, Killian receives an offer from Devon King, the beautiful and wealthy owner-operator of KJCM-FM, to become "The Nighthawk", host of an overnight talk show, taking calls from listeners and acting as a detective solving their problems during the day (the title of Killian's show would later be adopted in real life by talk-show host George Noory on KTRS in St. Louis from 1996 until 2003, when Noory took over from the retiring Art Bell as host of the nationally syndicated Coast to Coast AM). Even though Killian snapped that he doesn't listen to FM radio, he accepted the offer.

Killian's adventures took him frequently back into the realm of police work, where several of his former colleagues were less than happy to see him again.  He faced myriad problems, both personal and professional, and was at various points required to come to grips with the nature of his relationship with both his absentee father and his troubled siblings.  What he never seemed to come to grips with, however, was his relationship, or lack of one, with Devon. Devon eventually became pregnant in a relationship with another man and sold the station (Kilbourne was simultaneously pregnant in real life). Despite hard-hitting topical episodes dealing with AIDS, capital punishment, and child abuse among other topics, the show lost its audience when it was moved from its original time slot and was cancelled after three seasons.

Killian's radio show sign-off comment was "Good night, America, wherever you are."

Midnight Caller strength was a combination of well-created stories shaped by realistic and topical characters. The stories also rotated around the main cast, and its well-developed characters allowed the viewers to relate to them. The show's jazz music soundtrack also added to its popularity.

In October 1990, Wendy Kilbourne (Devon King) left the show due to her pregnancy. Lisa Eilbacher (Nicky Molloy) became the new female lead role.

Episodes

Cast and characters

 Gary Cole as Jack Killian
 Wendy Kilbourne as Devon King
 Dennis Dun as Billy Po
 Mykel T. Williamson as Deacon Bridges
 Arthur Taxier as Lt. Carl Zymak
 Lisa Eilbacher as Nicky Molloy

Production

Title
Series creator Richard DiLello took the title of the series from a song written by Pete Ham for the band Badfinger.  DiLello had previously authored The Longest Cocktail Party, a history of the rise and fall of The Beatles' corporation, Apple Corps, and their record label, Apple Records, where Badfinger had originally been signed.  The song itself had no relation to the series' subject matter; it had been written by Ham in tribute to a friend of the band who had resorted to working as a high-priced prostitute to pay her bills.

"After It Happened" controversy

In the 1988 episode "After It Happened", a bisexual man is depicted as an AIDS carrier who deliberately infects heterosexual women. As originally conceived, the man is gunned down in a vigilantism murder by one of the women whom he infects, and a medical team in full Hazmat suit comes to take his body away as Jack Killian comforts the distraught shooter. In the broadcast version, the victim is stopped before she can kill the carrier. Coming in the early years of the epidemiology of HIV/AIDS in the US at a time when public understanding of the disease was quite low, the proposed episode was immediately criticised as sensationalistic, ignorant of bisexuality, and pseudoscience. Protests were launched by GLAAD, BiNet USA and bialogue, among others. Additionally ACT UP pickets disrupted the show's filming. Then-NBC affiliate KRON-TV in San Francisco ran a disclaimer before the show with an AIDS hotline number and aired a half-hour live special, Midnight Caller: The Response, during which activists and public health officials aired their grievances.

Awards and nominations
In 1989, both Kay Lenz and Joe Spano won an Emmy Award for Outstanding Guest Actress in a Drama Series and Outstanding Guest Actor in a Drama Series, for their performances in the episodes "After It Happened" and "The Execution of John Saringo", respectively.

International distribution
In the Philippines, the show was broadcast on PTV-4 from 1990 to 1991, and then ABC-5 from 1992 to 1996, with dubbing in Tagalog from 1994. In the UK, it was broadcast by BBC1 from 1989, before later being re-run on ITV in the late '90s,  and being re-acquired for broadcast by Forces TV in 2021. In New Zealand, the series was one of the early shows on the then-newly launched TV3, and it was screened in the early 1990s.

It is not currently available on any streaming channel.

References

External links
 
 Midnight Caller cast and episode guide at The Gary Cole Archives

1980s American drama television series
1990s American drama television series
1988 American television series debuts
1991 American television series endings
American detective television series
English-language television shows
NBC original programming
Television series about radio
Television series by Lorimar Television
Television shows set in San Francisco